The Minister for Work and Pensions, or Parliamentary Under Secretary of State for Work and Pensions in the House of Lords, is a junior position in the Department for Work and Pensions in the British government. It is currently held by The Viscount Younger of Leckie, who took the office on 1 January 2023.

Responsibilities
The minister's responsibilities include:

spokesperson for DWP business in the House of Lords
child maintenance
family test
parental conflict
legislation and statutory instruments strategy
Social Security Advisory Committee (SSAC) relationship management
Social Fund (Cold Weather Payments, Sure Start Maternity grants, Funeral Expenses Payment scheme and Budgeting loans)
bereavement benefits
supported accommodation
Support for Mortgage Interest
maternity benefits
departmental planning and performance management, including oversight of: the single departmental plan, including tracking progress against manifesto commitments other external reporting and governance requirements
departmental business, including oversight of: departmental capability in commercial and digital affairs commercial contracting policy
transparency and data-sharing issues
research and trialling
Office for Nuclear Regulation

Ministers for Work and Pensions

References

Politics of the United Kingdom
Ministerial offices in the United Kingdom